The South Canon Bridge is a truss footbridge spanning the Colorado River near Glenwood Springs, Colorado. It was built in 1915 by the Missouri Valley Bridge & Iron Co.  It was listed on the National Register of Historic Places (reference number 85000212) in 1985.).

It was built during 1914-15 and has a Pennsylvania truss design, with 10 panels. It was built by the Missouri Valley Bridge and Iron Company for $9430.

It is now closed to vehicular traffic, and used as a pedestrian bridge.

Vehicular Bridges in Colorado TR

See also
National Register of Historic Places listings in Garfield County, Colorado

References

Bridges over the Colorado River
Former road bridges in the United States
Pedestrian bridges in Colorado
Truss bridges in the United States
Road bridges on the National Register of Historic Places in Colorado
Bridges completed in 1915
National Register of Historic Places in Garfield County, Colorado
Transportation buildings and structures in Garfield County, Colorado